Dawes Point is a suburb of the City of Sydney, in the state of New South Wales, Australia. Dawes Point is located on the north-western edge of the Sydney central business district, at the southern end of Sydney Harbour Bridge, adjacent to The Rocks. At times Dawes Point has been considered to be part of The Rocks, or known as West Rocks, part of Millers Point, or part of it known as Walsh Bay.

History
The suburb of Dawes Point is on unceded Gadigal Country. The point was originally known by the Aboriginal names of Tar-ra and Tullagalla. This was later changed by Governor Hunter at William Dawes' request to Point Maskelyne in honour of his patron Reverend Dr Nevil Maskelyne, British Astronomer Royal. He sent out the first astronomical instruments which were established at the point in the country's first observatory, by Lieutenant William Dawes (1762-1836), astronomer with the First Fleet. The point was renamed in honour of Dawes. Dawes Point is one of the places around Sydney Harbour that has been officially gazetted as a dual named site by the NSW Geographical Names Board. It was officially gazetted Dawes Point / Tar-Ra in 2002. 

It was also the site of the first guns mounted in Sydney by Dawes in 1788, contained Sydney's first cemetery and later Dawes Point Battery. Walsh Bay was the site of Sydney's port facilities. The wharves were converted to apartments, theatres, restaurants, cafes and a hotel.

By the 1840s, the people of Dawes Point and Millers Point were a maritime community in which rich and poor mixed more than elsewhere in Sydney. Wharf owners and traders lived and worked beside those who worked on the wharves and bond stores, as well as those who arrived and left on ships. Only two of the merchant houses, built by and for the early wharf owners, survive. One is Walker's 50-foot wide villa built around 1825 and now part of Milton Terrace at 7-9 Lower Fort Street; the other is the home and offices of Edwards and Hunter, built in 1833 above their wharves which is where the Wharf Theatre now stands.

Mostly prosperous in its early years, the area was less desirable by the 1890s. At the beginning of the 20th century, the government compulsorily acquired all private wharves, homes and commercial properties in the Rocks, Dawes Point and Millers Point. Modern and efficient wharves with dual level access were built, as well as new accommodation for workers, such as the Workers Flats of Lower Fort Street designed by Government Architect Vernon.

In the 1960s and '70s, high-rise offices were proposed for the area, but Green Bans, supported by community and unions, helped thwart these plans.

Following the Green Bans, and its most prominent campaign, The Battle for The Rocks, urban planning included more community consultation. The Rocks Green Ban was lifted so the Sirius Building could be built to house those displaced by The Rocks redevelopment and to house members of the maritime community whose families had lived in The Rocks, Dawes Point and Millers Point since the earliest years of the Colony.

During 2014–18, the majority of the area's social housing was sold and its tenants left the Millers Point area. The NSW Government also sold the Sirius Building for redevelopment as private apartments.

Heritage listings 
Dawes Point has a number of heritage-listed sites, including:
 37 Lower Fort Street: Dawesleigh
 Bradfield Highway and North Shore railway: Sydney Harbour Bridge
 8-12 Trinity Avenue: Darling House c1833-1842
1-19 Lower Fort Street: Milton Terrace
21-23 Lower Fort Street, Millers Point: Nicholson's Cottages
25-33 Lower Fort Street: Linsley Terrace
35 Lower Fort Street: Major House
39-41 Lower Fort Street: John Verge Townhouses
43 Lower Fort Street: Bligh House (Clydebank)
47-53 Lower Fort Street: Palermo Terrace
57-61 Lower Fort Street: Flavelle Terrace
63-65 Lower Fort Street
69-73 Lower Fort Street
75-77 Lower Fort Street
79 Lower Fort Street
81 Lower Fort Street, The Hero of Waterloo Hotel

Population
At the 2021 census, the population of Dawes Point had increased to 385.

In the 2016 census, there were 357 people in Dawes Point. 63.8% of people were born in Australia and 76.2% of people only spoke English at home. The most common response for religion was No Religion at 39.9%.

Median mortgage repayments were $5,200 a month or $62,400 a year, the highest median mortgage repayment in the greater Sydney area.

Culture
The Sydney Theatre and The Wharf Theatre, which are part of the Sydney Theatre Company, are located in Dawes Point.

Gallery

References

External links

  [CC-By-SA]

 
Suburbs of Sydney
Sydney New Year's Eve